Sergey Istomin (born January 24, 1986) is a Kazakh weightlifter.

Biography 
He competed in Weightlifting at the 2008 Summer Olympics in the 105 kg division finishing 8th with 406 kg.

At the 2010 Asian Games  he ranked 3rd in the 105 kg category, with a total of 396 kg.

He is Asian Champion - 2011 in the 105 kg category, with a total of 397 kg.

He is 5 ft 11 inches tall and weighs 231 lb.

Notes and references

External links
 Sergey Istomin on Olimpic Sports

Kazakhstani male weightlifters
1986 births
Living people
Weightlifters at the 2008 Summer Olympics
Olympic weightlifters of Kazakhstan
Asian Games medalists in weightlifting
Weightlifters at the 2010 Asian Games
Weightlifters at the 2014 Asian Games
Asian Games bronze medalists for Kazakhstan
Medalists at the 2010 Asian Games
21st-century Kazakhstani people